Ogmograptis scribula, the scribbly gum moth, is a moth of the family Bucculatricidae. It is found in the Australian Capital Territory, New South Wales and Queensland.

Description
The wingspan is about 8 mm. They have narrow wings, long hair scales on the trailing edges of the wings and sombre colours. Not much is known about their life history, because they are difficult to rear and are reluctant to come to light. They appear to have a very short flight period. It is thought that the moth lays the egg onto the bark.

Scribbles
They mine the barks of various smooth-barked Eucalyptus species, causing so-called scribbles. This scribble has the form of a zigzag gallery in the surface of the bark. The mine consists of a sinuous, zigzag gallery that widens gradually as the larva grows. When the larva is about half grown, it reverses course and mines back parallel to the old mine. Larvae have been found feeding on Eucalyptus pauciflora, Eucalyptus rossii, Eucalyptus haemastoma, Eucalyptus racemosa and Eucalyptus sclerophylla. Pupation takes place in grey, ridged cocoons in litter near their host plant.

In 2007, Cooke and Edwards argued that O. scribula was the scribbler on Eucalyptus pauciflora, but that the scribbles on other ACT species of scribbly gum (Eucalyptus racemosa ssp. rossii, and E. delegatensis) came from a different species of Ogmograptis, since the patterning of the scribbles was consistently different across the three eucalypt species.

References

External links

 Australian Museum
 Australian Faunal Directory
 Australian Insects
 A Guide to Australian Moths

Moths of Australia
Bucculatricidae
Moths described in 1935
Taxa named by Edward Meyrick